The Ruedi–Allgower classification is a system of categorizing pilon fractures of the distal tibia.


Classification

See also 
Ankle fracture
Herscovici classification
Danis–Weber classification
Lauge-Hansen classification

References

Bone fractures
Ankle fracture classifications
Injuries of ankle and foot